"La Mantovana" or "Il Ballo di Mantova" (Mantua Dance) is a popular sixteenth-century song attributed to the Italian tenor Giuseppe Cenci, also known as Giuseppino del Biado, (d. 1616) to the text . Its earliest known appearance in print is in Biado's collection of madrigals of the year 1600. The melody, later also known as " and "", gained a wide popularity in Renaissance Europe, being recorded variously as the Flemish "Ik zag Cecilia komen", the Polish "Pod Krakowem", the Romanian "Carul cu boi", the Scottish "My mistress is prettie", and the Ukrainian "Kateryna Kucheryava". It is best known as the melody of Bedřich Smetana's Vltava and of the Israeli national anthem "Hatikvah".

Appearances in classical music 

"La Mantovana" appears in Il Scolaro by Gasparo Zanetti (1645), as "Ballo di Mantua" in Duo tessuti con diversi solfeggiamenti, scherzi, perfidie et oblighi by Giuseppe Giamberti (1657) and as "An Italian Rant" in John Playford's The Dancing Master (3rd edition, 1665).

"Fuggi, fuggi, dolente cor", a version of the madrigal setting, provides the source material for Biagio Marini's 1655 trio sonata in G minor (Op. 22, Sonata sopra "Fuggi dolente core").

The melody was famously used by the Czech composer Bedřich Smetana in his symphonic poem Vltava (Moldau) from his cycle celebrating Bohemia, Má vlast:

The motif was also used by the French composer Camille Saint-Saëns in the second movement of "Rhapsodie Bretonne".
"La Montavana" also appears in the song "Kucheriava Katerina", whose composer is unknown.

Samuel Cohen, a 19th century Jewish settler in Ottoman Palestine (now, Israel) who was born in Moldavia, adapted a Romanian variation of "La Mantovana" – "Carul cu boi" – to set Naftali Herz Imber's poem, "Hatikvah"; which later became the Israeli national anthem. Another, similar Romanian folk song, "Cucuruz cu frunza-n sus", is also based on "La Mantovana".

Lyrics

References

External links

16th-century songs
Italian folk songs
Baroque compositions